Lokman Hossain Fakir (27 Dec 1934 – 23 April 1991) was a Bangladeshi musician. Government of Bangladesh awarded him the first Bangladesh National Film Award for Best Music Director in 1975 for Choritrohin (1975) jointly with Debu Bhattacherjee. He was also awarded the Ekushey Padak in 2003 posthumously for his contribution to music.

Career
Fakir joined Bangladesh Betar in 1960 as an artist.

References

External links

1934 births
1991 deaths
People from Tangail District
Bangladeshi film score composers
Recipients of the Ekushey Padak
Best Music Director National Film Award (Bangladesh) winners